The Zilveren Harp (Silver Harp) is a Dutch award given annually to promising musical talent. The award is very prestigious and winners are chosen by a different jury each year. The Zilveren Harp is given by the foundation "Buma Cultuur", which aims to promote Dutch music.

The first award was given in 1969, and it has been presented every year since (except for the year 1972).

Buma Cultuur also presents the Gouden Harp award, which is given to an artist for his entire oeuvre and Buma Export Award for acts which are successful abroad.

Winners
The winners are announced at the end of the year, but the presentation is usually in February of the next year.

See also
 Gouden Harp
 List of music awards

References

External links
 Buma Cultuur

Dutch music awards